Daniel Dumitrescu (born 23 September 1968) is a retired Romanian boxer who won silver medals at the 1988 Olympics and 1989 European Amateur Boxing Championships. In 1989 he fled from Romania to Greece and then to Germany, where he stayed for one year. In 1993 he turned professional and retired in 1997 with a record of five victories and two losses.

References

External links 
 
 
 

1968 births
Living people
Boxers at the 1988 Summer Olympics
Boxers at the 1992 Summer Olympics
Olympic boxers of Romania
Olympic silver medalists for Romania
Olympic medalists in boxing
Romanian male boxers
Medalists at the 1988 Summer Olympics
Featherweight boxers
20th-century Romanian people